Tarchonanthus camphoratus (known as camphor bush for its scent, or leleshwa in Kenya), is a shrub or small tree, widespread in Africa south of the Sahel.

Description
The camphor bush can reach up to 6 meters in height. The twigs and younger stems are white-felted, as are the undersides of the leaves. The upper leaf surface is dark olive-green. Bruised leaves smell strongly of camphor. Tarchonanthus camphoratus is dioecious. Flowers are usually present from December to May (in South Africa), with cream colored panicles on a discoid head. Male flowering heads have several flowers whilst the female has only a few. The fruit is a dense and woolly achene.

Cultivation and uses
Tarchonanthus camphoratus wood is fragrant, close-grained, attractive, durable and rich in aromatic oils. It is used as wood fuel and a source of charcoal. It is also used as a traditional building material, in horticulture, and in tribal papermaking. Leleshwa is also a source of aromatic oils used as fragrances.  Its leaves are used by the Maasai to scent their homes and persons.

Medicinal use
Tarchonanthus camphoratus is used as a traditional remedy for respiratory illnesses. The species has wide range of local uses, including dental hygiene.

Gallery

References

Mutisieae
Flora of South Africa
Trees of South Africa
Plants described in 1753
Taxa named by Carl Linnaeus
Dioecious plants
Medicinal plants of Africa